The Best Hits is the second greatest hits album, and seventh overall release, from pop singer Enrique Iglesias. The album was released by Fonovisa after Iglesias had left them, and is the second of three compilation releases made available following his departure. The collection includes a number of album tracks and popular singles, although due to the release of Bailamos Greatest Hits a few months prior, failed to sell highly in the United States or Latin America. Unlike its predecessor, the album contains more singles than album tracks, and could be seen as more of a greatest hits than Bailamos Greatest Hits. The album was certified gold in the US for selling over 500,000 copies.

Track listing

Certifications and sales

See also
List of number-one Billboard Top Latin Albums from the 1990s
List of number-one Billboard Latin Pop Albums from the 1990s

References

Enrique Iglesias compilation albums
1999 greatest hits albums
Fonovisa Records compilation albums